The Blaeberry River is a tributary of the Columbia River in the Columbia Country of British Columbia, Canada, rising in the Canadian Rockies on the south side of Howse Pass and joining the Columbia midway between the town of Golden, at the confluence of the Kicking Horse River, and the east foot of the Rogers Pass, at the head of Kinbasket Lake and the mouth of the Beaver River.

Known to explorer David Thompson in 1807 as Portage Creek, in 1811 another fur company explorer, Alexander Henry the younger, named it the "Blaeberry Torrent", after the abundant berry bushes seen lining its bank (these were likely huckleberries) - "Blae" is Scots language for "blue".  The river has sometimes been incorrectly labelled the Blueberry River.

Blaeberry Falls is on the lower reaches of the river, approximately  up from its confluence with the Columbia.

Tributaries 

Ebon Creek
Parapet Creek
Wildcat Creek
Collie Creek
Ensign Creek
Mummery Creek
Martin Creek
Split Creek
Willowbank Creek
Redburn Creek
Hedberg Creek

See also

List of British Columbia rivers

References

Rivers of the Canadian Rockies
Tributaries of the Columbia River
Columbia Country
Rivers of British Columbia
Kootenay Land District